The Zulus Motorcycle Club, or Zulus MC, is a club for one percenter motorcycle enthusiasts. The club has a history of almost 50 years and is known for being one of the first black one percenter motorcycle clubs.

Well known black one percenter clubs include, the East Bay Dragons MC, the mixed race Chosen Few MC, and the mixed race but mostly black Wheels of Soul MC.

History 

The Zulus Motorcycle Club were founded in 1969. They had a different purpose to many other clubs of the time, in that they wanted to be based around black men, where almost all other clubs had been made up of only white men, even if unintentionally. Being a black one percenter motorcycle club even to this day makes them unusual. The Zulus MC founding Vice-President was Milton Vales, Jr.

Activities 
Zulus members are active in Ohio.

References

External links

Outlaw motorcycle clubs
Motorcycle clubs in the United States
Gangs in the United States